Robert Woodward Barnwell (December 27, 1849 - July 24, 1902) was the third bishop of the Diocese of Alabama in The Episcopal Church, serving only two years.

Early life and education
Barnwell was born on December 27, 1849, in Beaufort, South Carolina, son of John G. Barnwell and Emma Elliott. He was educated at Trinity College in Connecticut and graduated in 1871. While there, he was a member of the Fraternity of Delta Psi (St. Anthony Hall). He then studied at the General Theological Seminary and graduated in 1873.

Ordained Ministry
Barnwell was ordained deacon in 1873 by Bishop John Williams and priest in 1875 by Bishop John W. Beckwith. He served in St George's Church in Griffin, Georgia, between 1873 and 1876. In 1876 he transferred to Demopolis, Alabama, as rector of Trinity Church, while in 1880 he became rector of St Paul's Church in Selma, Alabama.

Episcopacy
On May 18, 1900, Barnwell was elected as the Coadjutor Bishop of Alabama. However, prior to his consecration, the diocesan bishop of Alabama Richard Hooker Wilmer died and hence Barnwell was instead consecrated as the third diocesan Bishop of Alabama on July 25, 1900, in St Paul's Church, Selma by the Bishop of Mississippi Hugh Miller Thompson. He died two years later on July 24, 1902, in Selma, Alabama.

References

1849 births
1902 deaths
Episcopal bishops of Alabama
19th-century American Episcopalians
19th-century American clergy
Trinity College (Connecticut) alumni
St. Anthony Hall